Muzio Giuseppe Spirito de Tommasini, sometimes referred to as Muzio Tommasini or as Mutius von Tommasini (4 June 1794 – 31 December 1879) was a botanist and politician born in Trieste under Austria-Hungary.

He first became interested in botany as a grammar school student in Ljubljana. While studying medicine at the University of Vienna, he was inspired by the work of professor Joseph Franz von Jacquin (1766-1839), and conducted investigations of flora in the vicinity of Vienna. Afterwards, Tommasini studied law at the University of Graz.

A career politician, he received his first appointment in 1817 as an official in the district of Istria.  During the following year he was elected district secretary of the city of Split. From 1839 to 1860 he was mayor of Trieste. Following his retirement in 1860, he devoted his time to investigations of local flora.

As a botanist he participated in several noteworthy expeditions. Early in his career he took exploratory trips to the Biokovo Mountains in 1823 and to Dalmatia in 1827. In 1832 he accompanied Nicolas-Théodore de Saussure (1767-1845) on a botanical excursion through the Austrian Littoral, and in 1837 with British botanist George Bentham (1800-1884) he carried out studies in the regions of Carniola, Carinthia and Friuli.

After his election as mayor in 1839, his scientific studies were largely confined to the vicinity of Trieste. However, in 1840 he journeyed to the Julian Alps, where he scaled Monte Matajur. Soon afterwards he collaborated with Otto Sendtner (1813-1859) on an exploratory trip to the coastal areas of Austria, where plants for an herbarium were collected.

Tommasini played an important part in the creation of the Civico Museo di Storia Naturale di Trieste. The species Crocus tommasinianus is named in his honor. This plant is commonly referred to as Elfenkrokus (elfin crocus) in Germany, and sometimes as "tommies" or "tommy" in English speaking countries.

References 
Sources
 This article is based on a translation of an equivalent article at the German Wikipedia, references listed as:
  Biographisches Lexikon des Kaiserthums Oesterreich (biography)
 Allgemeine Deutsche Biographie (biography)
Citations

19th-century Austrian botanists
1794 births
1879 deaths
University of Vienna alumni
University of Graz alumni
Austrian politicians
Mayors of Trieste